Víctorio Solares (born 5 February 1932) is a Guatemalan middle-distance runner. He competed in the men's 800 metres at the 1952 Summer Olympics. Solaris finished seventh in the 1955 Pan American Games 3000 metre steeplechase.

References

1932 births
Living people
Athletes (track and field) at the 1952 Summer Olympics
Guatemalan male middle-distance runners
Olympic athletes of Guatemala
Athletes (track and field) at the 1955 Pan American Games
Pan American Games competitors for Guatemala
Place of birth missing (living people)
Central American and Caribbean Games medalists in athletics